The Academy of Performing Arts in Bratislava (abbr. VŠMU) is a university founded on June 9, 1949.

The university consists of three faculties:
Theatre Faculty (Acting, Directing, Dramaturgy, Stage and Costume Design, Puppetry, Theatre Theory, Theatre Management)
Faculty of Film and Television (Directing, Documentary, Dramaturgy and Scriptwriting, Photography and Picture Composition, Animation, Editing, Sound Design, Production, Management and Business Studies, Film and TV Theory)
Faculty of Music and Dance (Composition, Orchestra Conducting, Theory of Music, Voice, Opera Directing, Instrumental Playing (16 majors), Dance (6 majors))

Notable alumni
Adriana Kučerová, soprano
Marek Maďarič, Slovak Minister of Culture 
Alexander Moyzes, composer
Ján Cikker, composer
Jolana Fogašová, soprano
Ľudovít Rajter, composer
Ľuboš Bernáth, composer
Frico Kafenda, composer
Ladislav Slovák, conductor
Ivan Hrušovský, composer
Pavol Gábor, tenor
Štefan Hoza, tenor
Bohdan Warchal, violinist
Miroslav Dvorský, tenor
Zuzana Piussi aka Susan Piussi, filmmaker
Juraj Nvota, theatre and film director
Martin Šulík, film director
Emília Vášáryová, actress
Tatiana Pauhofová, actress
Martin Kollar, photographer
Sylvia Čápová-Vizváry, pianist
Kristína Mravcová, actress
Lucia Popp, soprano
Edita Gruberová, soprano

References

External links 

  
General Information
Music and dance faculty

Academy of Performing Arts in Bratislava
Theatre in Slovakia
Education in Bratislava
Film schools in Slovakia